, formerly known as Itazuke Air Base, is an international and domestic airport located  east of Hakata Station  in Hakata-ku, Fukuoka, Japan.

Fukuoka Airport is the principal airport on the island of Kyushu and is the fourth busiest passenger airport in Japan. As of 2017, the airport is the fourth busiest single-runway airport in the world by passenger traffic (after Mumbai, London–Gatwick and İstanbul-Sabiha Gökçen). The airport is surrounded by residential areas; flights stop at 10 p.m. at the request of local residents and resume operation at 7 a.m. The domestic terminal is connected to the city by the Fukuoka City Subway, and a subway from the airport to the business district takes less than ten minutes. The international terminal is only accessible by road, although there is scheduled bus service to Hakata Station and the Tenjin area.  Alternatives to access the Fukuoka area include Saga Airport and Kitakyushu Airport.

Airlines and destinations

Passenger

History
The airport was built in 1944 by the Imperial Japanese Army Air Force as Mushiroda Airfield. After the war, the United States Air Force used the airfield as Itazuke Air Base from 1945 to 1972.  Itazuke actually comprised three installations: Itazuke AB, Itazuke (Kasuga) Administration Annex and Brady Air Base (Camp Brady). Itazuke and the Kasuga Annex were on the mainland while Brady  was in Saitozaki; on the peninsula (Umi no Nakamichi) that forms Hakata Bay.  Part of the confusion with the names stem from the days when the annex and Brady AB were Army installations before the USAF took command in 1956.

At its height, Itazuke AB was the largest USAF base on Kyūshū, but was closed in 1972 due to budget reductions and the overall reduction of United States military forces in Japan.

Japanese military base
Mushiroda was built by American and Allied POWs on farmland that once grew bumper rice crops during 1943. The base was first used by trainer aircraft. The airfield soon proved unserviceable for the fledgling flyers because of the high water level of the former rice lands. Frequent rain showers flooded the runway making it unsafe for the novice aviators.

The Japanese Air Force's 6th Fighter Wing replaced the trainers and Mushiroda became an air defense base. The 6th Wing had 30 single engine fighters and several reconnaissance aircraft to patrol the Okinawa-Kyūshū aerial invasion corridor. In April 1945, the Tachiarai Airfield at Kurume was destroyed by American B-29's. Tachiarai's bomber aircraft were moved to Mushiroda and the base became very active until late in the war when B-29's attacked the airfield and destroyed most of the Imperial Japanese forces stationed here.

Postwar era

The first American units moved into the facility in November 1945, when the 38th Bombardment Group stationed B-25 Mitchells on the airfield. Moving to Itazuke from Yontan Airfield, Okinawa, the mission of the 38th Bomb Group was to fly daily surveillance missions to monitor shipping traffic between Kyūshū and Korea in order to intradict smuggling of illegal Korean immigrants and goods. Along with the 38th, the 8th Fighter Group was assigned to the airfield on 1 April 1946 which performed occupation duties until April 1947. Due to the massive destruction of the facility during the War, the only available buildings to house personnel was the Kyūshū Airplane Company's complex in Zasshonokuma. Designated Base Two, the former aircraft company was converted to barracks, dining halls, a post exchange, and BOQ. Additional facilities and billets were housed in a tent city at the airfield.

The 38th Bomb Group remained at Itazuke until October 1946 also during with time several reconstruction units worked on the former IJAAF base rebuilding and constructing new facilities. Headquarters, 315th Bombardment Wing moved into the base during May 1946, spending most of the postwar occupation years at the new American Air Force base.

When the 38th Bomb Group moved to Itami Airfield, it was replaced by the P-61 Black Widow-equipped 347th Fighter Group that moved from Nagoya Airfield. The 347th's mission was to provide air defense of Japanese airspace with the long range former night fighter. the 347th Fighter Wing, All Weather, was established at Itazuke in August 1948 when the unit was reformed under the new United States Air Force "Base-Wing" reorganization. The 347th moved to Bofu Air Base in October. It was replaced by the 475th Fighter Wing which brought with it the new F-82 Twin Mustangs, replacing the wartime Black Widows for air defense missions. Once up to full strength, it was moved to Ashiya Airfield in March 1949.

By early 1949, reconstruction of Itazuke was complete along the construction of long jet runways. The 8th Fighter Wing moved in during March with the F-80C Shooting Star jet, which provided air interceptor defense of Japan.

Korean War

Itazuke played a key role in the Korean War and the defense of the Pusan perimeter in 1950.

On June 25, 1950, North Korea invaded South Korea, starting a war that would last three years. Being the closest USAF base to the Korean Peninsula, the 8th Fighter Wing at Itazuke initially provided air cover for the evacuation of Americans from Korea on June 26, the day after the invasion. In these early operations, Itazuke Air Base supported F-80C Shooting Star jet fighters of the 8th Fighter Wing, along with propeller driven aircraft such as the F-82C Twin Mustangs of the 68th Fighter Squadron, All Weather, and P-51D Mustangs which were shipped from the United States for ground support missions in South Korea. The first aerial victory of the Korean War went to 1Lt William G. Hudson, of the 68th Fighter Squadron, All Weather in an F-82.

During the Korean War, Itazuke was a major combat airfield for the USAF. The 8th Fighter Wing moved to a forward base in South Korea in late Fall of 1950. With the move, the support element that remained at Itazuke was redesignated the 6160th Air Base Wing. The USAF moved several of its combat units to the base for operations over Korea, these being the 49th Fighter Group, the 58th Fighter-Bomber Wing; the 51st Fighter-Interceptor Wing; the 452d Bombardment Wing; the 27th Fighter-Escort Wing and the Texas Air National Guard 136th Fighter Group. A wide variety of aircraft operated from the airfield from twin-engined B-26 Invader tactical bombers, F-80 Shooting Stars, F-84 Thunderjets, F-82 Twin Mustangs and F-94 Starfire jet interceptors.

Cold War
After the 1953 Armistice in Korea, the wartime combat units were slowly withdrawn back to the United States or reassigned to other airfields in Japan and South Korea. The base settled down to another era of peace to become the key base in the defense of Western Japan. The 8th Fighter Wing returned to Itazuke from its forward airfield at Suwon AB (K-13), South Korea in October 1954, being the host unit at the base for the next ten years.

During the 1950s, the 8th flew the F-86 Sabre for air defense of Japan and South Korea, being upgraded to the new F-100 Super Sabre in 1956. In 1961 the wing received Air Defense Command F-102 Delta Daggers, specifically designed for the air defense mission.

The eighth was reassigned back to the United States in July 1964 to George AFB, California where it was equipped with the new F-4C Phantom II and eventually became a major USAF combat wing in Thailand during the Vietnam War. With the departure of the eighth TFW, the 348th Combat Support Group became the host unit at Itazuke, with the Pacific Air Forces 41st Air Division becoming the operational USAF unit at the base. During the 1960s and numerous rotational units from the United States deployed to the base. The F-105 Thunderchief-equipped 35th Tactical Fighter Squadron was the major flying organization until 1968, when it was moved to Thailand for combat operations over North Vietnam during the Vietnam War. During the Vietnam War, a detachment of the 552d Airborne Early Warning and Control Wing which operated C-121 Constellation AWACS aircraft operated from Itazuke, but the stable situation in South Korea led to the gradual phase down of the base and personnel were withdrawn for other duties.

In 1970 it was announced that Itazuke would be returned to Japanese control, and the USAF facilities were closed on 31 March 1972.

Civilian usage

Fukuoka's first civilian air service was Japan Airlines' Fukuoka-Osaka-Tokyo service, which commenced in 1951. JAL introduced jet service on the Fukuoka-Tokyo route in 1961. The airport's first international service was to nearby Busan, South Korea, beginning in 1965. Air Siam and Air France both began long-haul service to Fukuoka in 1975, but withdrew within two years.

In the mid-1990s, Delta Air Lines operated a non-stop flight between Fukuoka and its transpacific hub in Portland, Oregon, but later dropped the route due to financial pressure. Japan Airlines operated flights from Fukuoka to Hawaii until withdrawing in 2005. Delta launched service to Honolulu in 2011, which was successful beyond expectations, particularly due to the opening of the Kyushu Shinkansen which made it a convenient resort route offering for passengers from throughout Kyushu. This led to an increase of Delta's frequencies in 2012, as well as Hawaiian Airlines offering a daily Fukuoka-Honolulu service.

Expansion
Although Fukuoka is known as one of the most convenient airports in Japan, it is constrained both by its inner-city location and by its single runway. The International Terminal was opened in 1999. Operations at the airport began to exceed its capacity of 145,000 annual flights in 2012, the year in which several new low-cost carriers began operation. The Japan Civil Aviation Bureau has announced that Fukuoka will be designated as a "congested airport" (IATA Level 3) from late March 2016, meaning that the airport will be subject to slot restrictions and operators will have to receive 5-year permits from JCAB in order to operate at FUK.

With Fukuoka's ambitions to become a hub for business and travel in East Asia, moving the airport further inland or to an offshore artificial island to accommodate increased traffic has been considered. However, the idea of a new airport in the sea off Shingu has been opposed by environmentalists. The Gan-no-su coastal area has also been mooted, and it was the site of an airfield in the 1940s, but similar environmental concerns exist there. There is some debate as to whether a new airport is really needed, given the cost, the environmental problems, and the available capacity at alternates Kitakyushu Airport and Saga Airport, though much more distant from the city center.

, the Japanese government was considering building a second 2,800 m parallel runway within the existing airfield at a cost of 180 billion yen, two-thirds of which would be borne by the national government and the remaining third of which would be borne by the local government by 2019. , FUK will follow the model of other airports nationwide and undergo privatization. Construction of the second runway and a second parallel taxiway on the domestic side are both scheduled by fiscal year 2024 in order to free up traffic jams that currently occur due to overcrowding on the ground.

Accidents and incidents
 In 1962, an F-100 crashed on takeoff.  The wreckage came to rest not far from the Fukuoka terminal.  The plane was destroyed, and the pilot was killed.
 On March 31, 1970, Japan Airlines Flight 351, carrying 131 passengers and 7 crew from Tokyo to Fukuoka, was hijacked by 9 members of the Japanese Red Army group. 23 passengers were freed at Fukuoka Airport, mainly children or the elderly. 108 passengers and all crew members with the Red Army group left Fukuoka, bound for Gimpo Airport, near Seoul. Three days later, the Red Army group asked to be flown to North Korea's capital Pyongyang, before leaving from Seoul, 103 passenger and crew hostages were freed, and 9 Red Army group members surrendered to North Korean authorities.
 On December 17, 1989, a hijacked CAAC Flight 981 plane made an emergency landing at the airport. The suspect, a Chinese national, was extradited to China after having been detained in Japan for four months. He was later tried there and sentenced to eight years of imprisonment and an additional two years of disfranchisement on July 18, 1990.
 On June 13, 1996, a Garuda Indonesia Airways DC-10, Flight 865, crashed on take-off, killing 3 passengers and injuring 18. The pilot appeared to hesitate about applying full throttle upon a single engine failure. The crash occurred within the airport perimeter when the aircraft was already airborne, nine feet off the ground.

Statistics

Current Japan Self-Defense Force Units
Commanded from the nearby Kasuga Air Base:
 Japan Air Self-Defense Force
 Western Air Command Support Squadron (Kawasaki T-4)
 Kasuga Helicopter Airlift Squadron (CH-47J)

Nearby major airports

See also
Naval Base Okinawa

References

 Fletcher, Harry R. (1989) Air Force Bases Volume II, Active Air Force Bases outside the United States of America on 17 September 1982. Maxwell AFB, Alabama: Office of Air Force History. 
 Maurer, Maurer (1983). Air Force Combat Units Of World War II. Maxwell AFB, Alabama: Office of Air Force History. .
 Ravenstein, Charles A. (1984). Air Force Combat Wings Lineage and Honors Histories 1947–1977. Maxwell AFB, Alabama: Office of Air Force History. .

External links

Fukuoka Airport Building Co.,Ltd
Fukuoka Airport map
 
 

Airports in Kyushu
Airports established in 1944
Transport in Fukuoka
Buildings and structures in Fukuoka
Japan Self-Defense Forces
1944 establishments in Japan